Dunhuang ~ Romantic Energy (敦煌), is an album by Twelve Girls Band.  It consists of seventeen songs in a sort of modernized Chinese form. It was released in 2005.

Track listing
"Dunhuang"
"El Condor Pasa"
 "Ruten"
 "Whispering Earth"
 "Romantic Energy"
 "From the Beginning Till Now"
 "Yangguan"
 "Carnival"
 "Fairies of Yardan"
 "Ihojin"
 "Flower" (Orange Range)
 "River Shule"
 "Mogao Grottoes"
 "Yueya Spring"
 "Tang Court Ensemble"
 "Ten-sided Ambush"
 "Lovers"

US Track listing
The version of the album released in the United States (by Muture Communications Inc) has an altered track order, and includes a 15-minute DVD.

"Dunhuang"
 "Ruten"
 "River Shule"
 "Romantic Energy"
"El Condor Pasa"
 "Tang Court Ensemble"
 "From the Beginning Till Now"
 "Yangguan"
 "Whispering Earth"
 "Flower"
 "Carnival"
 "Freedom" (live)

The DVD consists of:
"Ruten" (live)
"Carnival" (live)
"Dunhuang" (music video)

Personnel
Jianfeng Liang – Producer
Hajime Nagai – Engineer
Jun Li – Engineer
Zhemin Lin – Engineer
Yu Liu – Engineer
Shigeki Kashii – Mixing Engineer
Jun Li – Mixing Engineer
Tinyau Hung – Mixing Engineer

Additional Personnel
Eiichi Naito – Executive Producer, Management (USA)
Dino Malito – A&R 
Hitoshi Saito – Marketing
Kio Griffith – Art Direction & Design

References

2005 albums
Twelve Girls Band albums